The 2003 Nigerian Senate election in Sokoto State was held on April 12, 2003, to elect members of the Nigerian Senate to represent Sokoto State. Badamasi Maccido representing Sokoto North, Sule Yari Gandi representing Sokoto East and Umaru Dahiru representing Sokoto South all won on the platform of the All Nigeria Peoples Party.

Overview

Summary

Results

Sokoto North 
The election was won by Badamasi Maccido of the All Nigeria Peoples Party.

Sokoto East 
The election was won by Sule Yari Gandi of the All Nigeria Peoples Party.

Sokoto South 
The election was won by Umaru Dahiru of the All Nigeria Peoples Party.

References 

April 2003 events in Nigeria
Sok
Sokoto State Senate elections